The Lagoda is a half-scale model of the American 19th century whaling ship Lagoda.

Lagoda or Łagoda may also refer to:

 Łagoda, Poland, a village
 , a United States Navy patrol vessel in commission from 1918 to 1919
 Natalya Lagoda (1974–2015), Russian–Ukrainian singer, entertainer and model
 Vladislav Lagoda, Ukrainian figure skater - see 2012 Ukrainian Figure Skating Championships
 Yuriy Lagoda, a draughts (checkers) player - see 2012 European championships of international draughts
 The Łagoda family, characters in the Polish soap opera M jak miłość